is a  quasi-national park on the Oshima Peninsula in southwest Hokkaidō, Japan. The park, which was designated as quasi-national in 1958, is the smallest major park in Hokkaidō.

Ōnuma and Konuma were created when mudflows due to eruptions of Hokkaidō Koma-ga-take dammed up depressions at the base of the mountain. The ponds, which are dotted with watershields, are surrounded by birch and maple forests.

Related cities, towns and villages
Nanae, Hokkaidō

See also
List of national parks of Japan

References

External links 
J-IBIS 

National parks of Japan
Parks and gardens in Hokkaido
Protected areas established in 1958